The Royal Norwegian Ministry of Labour and Social Affairs is a Norwegian ministry established in 1916. It is responsible for the labour market, the working environment, pensions, welfare, social security, integration, immigration, asylum, minorities and the Sami. Since 24 January 2020 the department has been led by Torbjørn Røe Isaksen (Conservative Party).

Name history
 1 September 1885–22 February 1946: Norwegian Ministry of Labour
 20 December 1948–31 December 1989: Norwegian Ministry of Local Government and Labour (see Ministry of Local Government and Regional Development)
 1 January 1998–1 October 2004: Norwegian Ministry of Labour and Government Administration (see Ministry of Government Administration, Reform and Church Affairs)
 1 January 2006–31 December 2009: Norwegian Ministry of Labour and Social Inclusion
 1 January 2010–2013: Norwegian Ministry of Labour
2014 –: Norwegian Ministry of Labour and Social Affairs

Subsidiaries

Agencies
  (Norwegian Labour and Welfare Service) — Administers age- and disability pensions and other welfare and manages unemployment.
 (Norwegian Directorate of Labour and Welfare) — Manages the Norwegian Labour and Welfare Service.
 (Labour Court of Norway) — Court that takes under consideration disputes about validity, interpretation and existence of collective agreements, questions regarding breach of collective agreements, questions regarding breach of the peace obligation, and claims for damages resulting from such breaches.
 (Norwegian Labour Inspection Authority) — Authority aimed at occupational health and safety.
 (Norwegian Pension Insurance for Seamen) — Administers the seamen's pension.
 (Petroleum Safety Authority Norway) — Ensures occupational safety and health in the petroleum industry.
 (State Conciliator of Norway) — Negotiates wage and tariff disputes between employer and labour unions.
 (National Institute of Occupational Health) — Research.
  (Norwegian Public Service Pension Fund)

Standing Committees and Boards 
 Rikslønnsnemnda (National Wages Board)
 (Collective Bargaining Board)

Limited companies
 Rehabil, rehabilitation workplace

See also
 List of Norwegian Ministers of Labour and Social Inclusion

References

External links
 Norwegian Ministry of Labor
Norwegian Labor and Welfare Service
Labour Court of Norway
Norwegian Labour Inspection Authority
Norwegian Pension Insurance for Seamen
Petroleum Safety Authority Norway
State Conciliator of Norway
National Institute of Occupational Health
Norwegian Public Service Pension Fund
National Wages Board
Collective Bargaining Board
Rehabil

Labour and Social Inclusion
Integration ministries
Indigenous affairs ministries
Labour ministries
Labour in Norway
1916 establishments in Norway
Immigration services
Ministries established in 1916